Bagrat III (c. 960 – 7 May 1014), of the Georgian Bagrationi dynasty, was King of Abkhazia from 978 on (as Bagrat II) and King of Georgia from 1008 on. He united these two titles by dynastic inheritance and, through conquest and diplomacy, added more lands to his realm, effectively becoming the first king of the Kingdom of Georgia. Before Bagrat was crowned as king, he had also reigned in Kartli as co-ruler with his father Gurgen from 976 to 978.

Early life and rule in Kartli
Bagrat was born in about 960 to Gurgen, a Bagrationi Dynasty prince from Kartli, and his wife, Gurandukht, who was a daughter of the king George II of Abkhazia. Being still in his minority, Bagrat was adopted by his childless kinsman David III Kuropalates (r. 990–1000), presiding prince of Tao and the most powerful ruler in the Caucasus.

The Abkhazian Kingdom was then under the rule of Theodosius III the Blind, a weak and inauspicious king, who was Bagrat’s uncle by his mother’s side. The kingdom was engulfed into complete chaos and feudal warfare. Exploiting the situation, Prince Kvirike II of Kakheti (939–976), which is now the easternmost region of Georgia, raided Kartli, hitherto under the authority of the Abkhazian kings, and laid siege to its rock-hewn stronghold Uplistsikhe. Ioane Marushis-dze, the energetic eristavi (governor) of Kartli, urged, in 976, David III of Tao to take control of the province or give it to Bagrat in hereditary possession. David responded vigorously and the Kakhetians had to withdraw to avoid the confrontation. David gave Kartli to Bagrat and installed Gurgen as his regent. The Kakhetians quickly returned to the offensive and seized Bagrat and his parents. However, David promptly interfered and restored his stepson in Kartli.

King of the Abkhazians
In 978, Ioane Marushis-dze, aided by David, forced Theodosius of Abkhazia to abdicate the throne in favour of his nephew Bagrat. The latter left his mother, Gurandukht, to govern Kartli and proceeded to Kutaisi to be crowned King of the Abkhazians. Disorder was still rampant in the kingdom, but Bagrat’s descent from both Bagratid and Abkhazian dynasties made him an acceptable choice for the nobles of the realm who were growing weary of internecine quarrels.

Within two years, Bagrat assumed full ruling powers. He proved an able ruler and succeeded in restoring law and order in his kingdom. While he was in Kutaisi, the aristocratic opposition of Kartli led by Kavtar Tbeli disregarded Gurandukht’s authority and ran their fiefdoms as semi-independent rulers. When Bagrat returned to Kartli to deal with this situation, the nobles offered him an armed resistance, but the king won the battle at Moghrisi, and forced the rebels into submission. Finally he directed his attention towards Kldekari in Lower Kartli, whose duke Rati continued to ignore the royal authority and ruled rather independently.

The preparations for this expedition, in 989, produced much confusion as David of Tao was misinformed about the true intentions of his stepson. Persuaded that the latter intended to remove and kill him, David launched a surprise attack and dispersed the forces led by Bagrat’s natural father, Gurgen, before the Abkhazian king himself could arrive. According to Georgian chronicles,

"Bagrat then went [to David] alone, fell at his feet and swore that he was going against Rati. [David] believed that too and released him in peace".

After the reconciliation with his stepfather, Bagrat was finally able to receive fealty from Rati who abandoned his duchy at swordpoint and retired to his minor patrimony in Argveti, western Georgia. David was murdered by his nobles in 1000, and his possessions, according to the previous agreement, passed to the Byzantine Emperor Basil II. Bagrat and Gurgen, this latter now reigning as King of Kings of the Georgians in parts of the southwestern Kartlian lands (994–1008), met with Basil but, unable to prevent the annexation of David’s realm, were forced to recognize the new borders. On this occasion, Bagrat was bestowed with the Byzantine title of kouropalates, and Gurgen with that of magistros, actually the competing titles since the dignity conferred upon the son was more esteemed than that granted to the father. This was done by the emperor, as the Georgian chronicles relate, to turn Gurgen against Bagrat, but he seriously miscalculated:"as Gurgen was honest and veracious, and [Basil] could not incite the envy in his heart and [Gurgen] did not succumb to his [Basil’s] ploy."

Later the same year, Gurgen attempted to take David Kuropalates’ succession by force, but he had to retreat in the face of the Byzantine commander Nikephoros Ouranos, dux of Antioch.

The unification

In 1008, Gurgen died, and Bagrat succeeded him as King of Kings of the Georgians, becoming thus the first king of a unified realm of Abkhazia and Iberia (in their broadest sense these two included Abkhazia proper/Abasgia, Egrisi/Samegrelo, Imereti, Svaneti, Racha-Lechkhumi, Guria, Ajaria, Kartli proper, Hither Tao, Klarjeti, Shavsheti, Meskheti, and Javakheti) what was to be henceforth known as Sakartvelo – "all-Georgia".

After he had secured his patrimony, Bagrat proceeded to press a claim to the easternmost Georgian Principality of Kakheti and annexed it in or around 1010, after two years of fighting and aggressive diplomacy. This formidable acquisition brought Bagrat’s realm to the neighbourhood of the Shaddadid emirate of Arran in what is now Azerbaijan, whose ruler al-Fadl I b. Muhammad (986–1031) raided Kakheti following its incorporation into Georgia. Bagrat drove back this incursion and, in alliance with the Armenian king Gagik I (989–1020), successfully campaigned against the Shaddadid city of Shamkir, levying a tribute upon it. Yet Bagrat’s foreign policy was generally peaceful and the king successfully manoeuvred to avoid the conflicts with both the Byzantine and Muslim neighbours even though Thither Tao remained in the Byzantine and Tbilisi in the Arab hands.

Bagrat’s reign, a period of uttermost importance in the history of Georgia, brought about the final victory of the Georgian Bagratids in the centuries-long power struggles. Anxious to create more stable and centralized monarchy, Bagrat eliminated or at least diminished the autonomy of the dynastic princes. In his eyes, the most possible internal danger came from the Klarjeti line of the Bagrationi, represented by the king’s cousins, Sumbat and Gurgen. Although seem to have acknowledged Bagrat’s authority, they continued to be styled as Kings, and Sovereigns of Klarjeti. To secure the succession to his son, George, Bagrat lured his cousins, on pretext of a reconciliatory meeting, to the Panaskerti Castle, and threw them in prison in 1010. Their children managed to escape to Constantinople, but Sumbat and Gurgen died in custody by 1012.

Bagrat was also known as a great promoter of Georgian Orthodox culture. Not only did he encourage learning and patronize the fine arts, but he built several churches and monasteries throughout his kingdom with the "Bagrati Cathedral" at Kutaisi, now a UNESCO World Heritage Site, Bedia Cathedral in Abkhazia, and Nikortsminda Cathedral in Racha being the most important.

Bagrat III died in 1014 in the Panaskerti Castle in Tao and was entombed in Bedia Cathedral. He was canonized by the Georgian Orthodox Church on 22 December 2016, his feast day set for 7 May (NS 21 May).

See also

Byzantine–Georgian wars
Divan of the Abkhazian Kings
History of Georgia
Tao-Klarjeti

Genealogy

References

Bibliography 
Eastmond, A (1998), Royal Imagery in Medieval Georgia, Penn State Press, 
Lordkipanidze, Mariam  (1967), Georgia in the XI-XII centuries, Ganatleba, edited by George B. Hewitt. Also available online at 
Rapp, SH (2003), Studies In Medieval Georgian Historiography: Early Texts And Eurasian Contexts, Peeters Bvba 
Suny, RG (1994), The Making of the Georgian Nation (2nd Edition), Bloomington and Indianapolis, 

960s births
1014 deaths
10th-century Kings of Abkhazia
Bagrationi dynasty of the Kingdom of Georgia
Kings of Georgia
Eastern Orthodox monarchs
11th-century Kings of Abkhazia
Kouropalatai